Janet Eldred is an American professor and author, currently the Chellgren Professor of English at the University of Kentucky, and has been largely collected by libraries worldwide.

References

University of Kentucky faculty
Living people
Year of birth missing (living people)
Place of birth missing (living people)
Kentucky women writers
American women non-fiction writers
American women academics
21st-century American women